The following is a list of Colgate Raiders men's basketball head coaches. There have been 20 head coaches of the Raiders in their 123-season history.

Colgate's current head coach is Matt Langel. He was hired as the Raiders' head coach in April 2011, replacing Emmett Davis, who was fired after the 2010–11 season.

References

Colgate

Colgate Raiders men's basketball coaches